Proctolabinae is a subfamily of grasshoppers in the family Acrididae. There are more than 20 genera and 210 described species which are found in South America.

Genera
The following genera, in 2 tribes, belong to the subfamily Proctolabinae:

Coscineutini 
synonym: Coscineutae Brunner von Wattenwyl, 1893
 Coscineuta Stål, 1873

Proctolabini 

 Adelotettix Bruner, 1910
 Ampelophilus Hebard, 1924
 Azotocerus Descamps, 1976
 Balachowskyacris Descamps & Amédégnato, 1972
 Cercoceracris Descamps, 1976
 Cryptocloeus Descamps, 1976
 Dendrophilacris Descamps, 1976
 Dorstacris Descamps, 1978
 Drymacris Descamps & Rowell, 1978
 Drymophilacris Descamps, 1976
 Eucephalacris Descamps, 1976
 Eucerotettix Descamps, 1980
 Halticacris Descamps, 1976
 Harpotettix Descamps, 1981
 Kritacris Descamps, 1976
 Leioscapheus Bruner, 1907
 Lithoscirtus Bruner, 1908
 Loretacris Amédégnato & Poulain, 1987
 Paratela Descamps & Rowell, 1978
 Pareucephalacris Descamps, 1976
 Poecilocloeus Bruner, 1910
 Proctolabus Saussure, 1859
 Saltonacris Descamps, 1976
 Tela Hebard, 1932
 Witotacris Descamps, 1976
 Ypsophilacris Descamps, 1980
 Zodiacris Descamps, 1980
 Zosperamerus Bruner, 1908

References

Further reading

 
 
 

Acrididae